Hélène Roussel, stage name of Yvonne Louise Gabrielle Roussel, (2 September 1932 – 5 December 2022) was a French actress. She was the sister of actress Michèle Morgan and the wife of actor .

Roussel died on 5 December 2022, at the age of 90.

Filmography
Service Entrance (1954)
Razzia sur la chnouf (1955)
Paris, Palace Hotel (1956)
The Man in the Raincoat (1957)
Retour de manivelle (1957)
 (1967)
Death in a French Garden (1985)
My Dear Subject (1988)
 (1989)
 (1990)
 (1991)
 (1993)
 (1993)
 (1994)
 (1994)
The Apprentices (1995)
The Eighth Day (1996)
The Dilettante (1999)
 (2004)
A Christmas Tale (2008)

References

1932 births
2022 deaths
French actresses
20th-century French actresses
French film actresses
People from Courbevoie